The Egyptian Liberation Party is a Sufi political party in Egypt. The party was founded by Sheikh Aboul Azayem; most of the members are part of the Al Azmeya Sufi order. The party is backed by the ‘Azmeyya Tareeka Sufi order.

The party calls itself social democratic.

References

Islamic political parties in Egypt
Islamic socialist political parties
Political parties in Egypt
Political parties with year of establishment missing
Social democratic parties in Africa
Sufism in Egypt